Amsterdamsche Football Club Door Wilskracht Sterk, also referred to as AFC DWS, Door Wilskracht Sterk or simply DWS, is a Dutch football club from Amsterdam, currently competing in the Tweede Klasse, the sixth tier of amateur football in the Netherlands.

History

AFC DWS was founded on 11 October 1907, by the trio of Robert Beijerbacht, Theo Beijerbacht and Jan van Galen under the name of Fortuna which was soon changed to Hercules. The team played in a blue and white striped shirt and white shorts. On 22 March 1909 the name was changed to DWS and the shirt colours became blue and black vertical stripes.

In 1954 the club entered professional football, playing its home matches in the Olympic Stadium in Amsterdam. It merged in 1958 with BVC Amsterdam into DWS/A. That name was dropped again in 1962 and turned back into DWS. 
DWS became champions of the Eredivisie in 1964, the same year they were promoted from the Eerste Divisie, which is a feat that has never been repeated since from any team after being promoted to the Eredivisie. DWS then reached the quarter finals of the 1964–65 European Cup, in the next season. Their 1964 triumph is the most recent occasion of a club without a predominantly red and white home strip (unlike recent contenders Ajax, AZ, Feyenoord, PSV and Twente) winning the Eredivisie title, a drought of 55 years.

In 1972 the club merged with Blauw-Wit Amsterdam and Volewijckers to form FC Amsterdam. DWS continued as an amateur club, which still exists. They celebrated their 100-year Jubilee in 2007.

Professional football results 1954 – 1972

DWS in Europe 

 (1) UCP = UEFA Co-efficiency points. Total number of points for UEFA Coefficient: 17.0
 (2) DWS skipped this round, since they were still active in the Europacup I
 (3) DWS are eliminated from the tournament since they are still active in the Europacup I

Honours
 Eredivisie: 1
1963–64
 KNVB District Cup West I: 1
1983

References

External links

 Official website 

 
Football clubs in the Netherlands
Football clubs in Amsterdam
Association football clubs established in 1907
1907 establishments in the Netherlands